In enzymology, a xylitol kinase is an enzyme that catalyzes the chemical reaction

ATP + xylitol  ADP + xylitol 5-phosphate

Thus, the two substrates of this enzyme are ATP and xylitol, whereas its two products are ADP and xylitol 5-phosphate.

This enzyme belongs to the family of transferases, specifically those transferring phosphorus-containing groups (phosphotransferases) with an alcohol group as acceptor.  The systematic name of this enzyme class is ATP:xylitol 5-phosphotransferase.

References

 

EC 2.7.1
Enzymes of unknown structure